Paping (pronounced pah ping) is a computer network administration utility used to test the reachability of a host on an Internet Protocol (TCP/IP) network and to measure the time it takes to connect to a specified port.  The name is a play on the word ping, another computer network administration utility.

Because ICMP can be used to identify the operating system of a remote machine, it is sometimes blocked.  If ICMP is blocked, ping cannot be used to identify if the service is responding.  Publicly available services must keep their relevant TCP or UDP ports open, paping can attempt to make connections to these ports to determine if a service is responding.  Similar utilities such as nmap allow a range of ports to be scanned, however they do not allow you to repetitively scan the same ports.

Paping operates by attempting to connect to an Internet Protocol TCP/IP port on the target.  In the process it measures the time taken for a connection to be established and records any connection failures.  The results of the test are printed in form of a statistical summary of the connections made including the minimum, maximum, and the mean connection times.

Paping is cross-platform software, currently supporting Windows and Linux.

As of April 2013, the project appears to be abandoned with no new fixes or versions being produced.

Sample paping test
The following is a sample output of paping against en.wikipedia.org on TCP/IP port 80 (http) from a Linux host:
./paping -p 80 en.wikipedia.org -c 10
paping v1.5.1 - Copyright (c) 2010 Mike Lovell

Connecting to text.pmtpa.wikimedia.org [208.80.152.2] on TCP 80:

Connected to 208.80.152.2: time=64.11ms protocol=TCP port=80
Connected to 208.80.152.2: time=64.03ms protocol=TCP port=80
Connected to 208.80.152.2: time=65.81ms protocol=TCP port=80
Connected to 208.80.152.2: time=63.56ms protocol=TCP port=80
Connected to 208.80.152.2: time=63.95ms protocol=TCP port=80
Connected to 208.80.152.2: time=64.29ms protocol=TCP port=80
Connected to 208.80.152.2: time=64.35ms protocol=TCP port=80
Connected to 208.80.152.2: time=64.99ms protocol=TCP port=80
Connected to 208.80.152.2: time=63.10ms protocol=TCP port=80
Connected to 208.80.152.2: time=64.02ms protocol=TCP port=80

Connection statistics:
        Attempted = 10, Connected = 10, Failed = 0 (0.00%)
Approximate connection times:
        Minimum = 63.10ms, Maximum = 65.81ms, Average = 64.22ms

References

External links 
 code.google.com/p/paping/

Network analyzers
Free network management software
Internet Protocol based network software
Unix network-related software
Windows communication and services
Windows administration